Heart of the Sea may refer to:

In the Heart of the Sea: The Tragedy of the Whaleship Essex, a 2000 nonfiction book by Nathaniel Philbrick
In the Heart of the Sea (film), a 2015 film by Ron Howard based on the book
Heart of the Sea, a 2000 novel by Nora Roberts
Heart of the Sea, a 2002 documentary film about American surfer Rell Sunn
"The Heart of the Sea", a song by Flogging Molly from their 2011 album Speed of Darkness

See also
Hearts at Sea, a 1950 Italian adventure film
Heart of the Ocean (disambiguation)